Marco Marcato (born 11 February 1984) is an Italian former racing cyclist, who last rode for UCI WorldTeam .

Career

For the 2014 season, Marcato joined , after his previous team –  – folded at the end of the 2013 season. Subsequently,  signed Marcato on a two-year contract from 2015, reuniting him with former Vacansoleil boss Hilaire Vanderschueren, and sharing leadership of the team in the Flemish classics with former Vacansoleil team-mate Björn Leukemans. In September 2016 it was announced that Marcato would join  for the 2017 season. He retired from competition at the end of the 2021 season.

Major results

2005
 1st Stage 2 Tour of Slovenia
 7th Giro della Romagna
 7th Gran Premio Città di Misano – Adriatico
 7th Gran Premio Industria e Commercio di Prato
 7th Giro del Piemonte
 10th Memorial Cimurri
2006
 1st Stage 4 Vuelta a Chihuahua
 3rd Gran Premio Industria e Commercio di Prato
 4th Coppa Bernocchi
 5th Giro della Romagna
 8th Overall Tour de Picardie
 10th Gran Premio Città di Misano – Adriatico
2007
 2nd Grand Prix Pino Cerami
 2nd Giro della Romagna
 5th Overall Circuit Franco-Belge
 5th Giro di Toscana
 6th Gran Premio Industria e Commercio di Prato
 7th Overall Rheinland-Pfalz Rundfahrt
 8th Clásica de Almería
 10th Overall Tour of Ireland
1st Stage 5
2008
 4th Overall Tour de Wallonie
 6th Gran Premio Industria e Commercio Artigianato Carnaghese
2009
 3rd Overall Tour de Luxembourg
1st  Young rider classification
 4th Paris–Camembert
 6th Overall Tour of Belgium
 7th Overall Tour de Picardie
 8th Overall Tour de Pologne
2010
 2nd Overall Tour de Wallonie
 2nd Giro di Toscana
 2nd Coppa Sabatini
 2nd Druivenkoers Overijse
 3rd Grand Prix Pino Cerami
 4th Eschborn–Frankfurt City Loop
 4th Memorial Marco Pantani
 5th Overall Circuit Franco-Belge
 5th Giro della Romagna
 5th Grand Prix of Aargau Canton
 6th Le Samyn
 7th Giro del Veneto
 8th Amstel Gold Race
 9th E3 Prijs Vlaanderen
 9th GP Ouest–France
 10th Grote Prijs Stad Zottegem
 10th Vattenfall Cyclassics
2011
 1st Tour de Vendée
 2nd Overall Étoile de Bessèges
 2nd Paris–Tours
 2nd Grand Prix Pino Cerami
 3rd Overall Tour de Pologne
 5th Druivenkoers Overijse
 6th Dwars door Vlaanderen
 6th Eschborn–Frankfurt City Loop
 7th Grand Prix Cycliste de Montréal
 8th Grand Prix Cycliste de Québec
 10th Overall Circuit de Lorraine
2012
 1st Paris–Tours
 1st Stage 4 Étoile de Bessèges
 2nd Grand Prix d'Ouverture La Marseillaise
 3rd Overall Circuit de Lorraine
 4th Druivenkoers Overijse
 6th GP Ouest–France
 6th Omloop Het Nieuwsblad
 7th Gent–Wevelgem
 8th Tour de Vendée
 10th Grand Prix de Wallonie
2013
 5th Overall Tour de Wallonie
 5th Grote Prijs Stad Zottegem
 6th Overall Tour de Luxembourg
 6th Druivenkoers Overijse
2014
 6th Overall Tour des Fjords
 8th Trofeo Laigueglia
 10th Overall Eneco Tour
2015
 2nd Classic Loire Atlantique
 2nd Druivenkoers Overijse
 2nd Gran Premio Industria e Commercio di Prato
 3rd Overall Danmark Rundt
 5th Grote Prijs Jef Scherens
 6th Grand Prix La Marseillaise
 7th Tour de Vendée
2016
 3rd Druivenkoers Overijse
 5th Dwars door het Hageland
 5th Grote Prijs Stad Zottegem
 7th Overall Tour de Luxembourg
 8th Trofeo Matteotti
 9th Overall Danmark Rundt

Grand Tour general classification results timeline

References

External links

1984 births
Living people
People from San Donà di Piave
Italian male cyclists
Cyclists from the Metropolitan City of Venice